Hyperolius adspersus is a species of frog in the family Hyperoliidae. It is known from western and southern Cameroon (outside the coastal plain), Gabon, Republic of the Congo, Cabinda Enclave of Angola, and western Democratic Republic of the Congo. It probably occurs Equatorial Guinea too. Common name sprinkled long reed frog has been coined for this species.

It does not occur in closed-canopy forest but appears to be capable of crossing unsuitable habitat because it is able to colonize open habitats inside undisturbed forest. Breeding takes place in marshes and pools, including human-made ones. No threats to this apparently common species are known. It is assumed to occur in some protected areas.

References

adspersus
Frogs of Africa
Amphibians of Angola
Amphibians of Cameroon
Amphibians of the Democratic Republic of the Congo
Amphibians of Gabon
Amphibians of the Republic of the Congo
Taxa named by Wilhelm Peters
Amphibians described in 1877
Taxonomy articles created by Polbot